This was the first edition of the tournament.

Irina Bara and Ekaterine Gorgodze won the title, defeating Aleksandra Krunić and Lesley Pattinama Kerkhove in the final, 4–6, 6–1, [11–9]. This was the first WTA Tour level title won by either Bara or Gorgodze.

Seeds

Draw

Draw

References

External links
Main Draw

Transylvania Open - Doubles